Paley Street is a small village in the civil parishes of White Waltham and Bray in the English county of Berkshire. By the later medieval period, 'street' was often used to describe straggling villages in areas of late woodland clearance. Paley Street is one such example. For many years in the 1990s a horse racing yard was located at Cedars Farm.

Amenities
Paley Street has two pubs; The Bridge House and The Royal Oak, the latter being a Michelin starred gastro pub owned by TV personality Michael Parkinson and run by his son, Nick.

References

External links

Villages in Berkshire
Bray, Berkshire
White Waltham